Joseph Gibbs may refer to:

 Joseph Gibbs (composer) (1699–1788), English composer
 Joseph Gibbs (cricketer) (1867–1899), English cricketer
 Joseph Gibbs (engineer) (1798–1864), British civil engineer and mechanical inventor
 Joseph Gibbs (artist), British portrait painter